Vingt-Cinq (Twenty-five in French) is the capital of the Agaléga Islands, two islands in the Indian Ocean, governed by Mauritius. It is located on the North Island, near a small airfield. In the town, there is a primary school (Jacques Le Chartier Government School) and a hospital. The name, Vingt-Cinq, is believed to refer to the number of lashes that slaves on the island received as punishment.

Vingt-Cinq is located north of Mauritius, and has a population of 200 (2012). The people of the island are mostly of French descent; the descendants of the first slaves from mainland Africa and Madagascar to Mauritius also live on the island.

References

Populated places in Mauritius